John Hanbury (born 13 May 1993) is an Irish hurler who plays as a left corner-back for club side Rahoon-Newcastle and formerly at inter-county level with the Galway senior hurling team.

Playing career

University

As a student at NUI Galway, Hanbury was a regular player on the university's senior hurling team in the Fitzgibbon Cup.

Club

Hanbury joined the Rahoon-Newcastle club at a young age and played in all grades at juvenile and underage levels, enjoying championship success in the under-21 grade in 2013., Currently plays American football with Amsterdam Crusaders.

Inter-county

Minor and under-21

Hanbury first played for Galway as a member of the minor hurling team on 23 July 2011. He made his first appearance in an 8-26 to 0-12 All-Ireland quarter-final defeat of Antrim at Parnell Park. On 4 September 2011, Hanbury was at left wing-back in Galway's 1-21 to 1-12 defeat of Dublin in the All-Ireland final at Croke Park.	

As a member of the Galway under-21 hurling team, Hanbury made his first appearance on 24 August 2013 in a 0-07 to 1-16 All-Ireland semi-final defeat by Clare.

Senior

Hanbury made his debut for the Galway senior team on 15 February 2015 in a 2-15 to 1-17 National Hurling League defeat of Clare. On 6 September 2015, Hanbury was at full-back for Galway's 1-22 to 1-18 defeat by Kilkenny in the All-Ireland final.

On 23 April 2017, Hanbury came on as a 65th-minute substitute for Daithí Burke when Galway defeated Tipperary by 3-21 to 0-14 to win the National Hurling League. Later that season he won his first Leinster Championship medal after Galway's 0-29 to 1-17 defeat of Wexford in the final. On 3 September 2017, Hanbury started for Galway at left corner-back when Galway won their first All-Ireland in 29 years after a 0-26 to 2-17 defeat of Waterford in the final.

On 8 July 2018, Hanbury won a second successive Leinster Championship medal following Galway's 1-28 to 3-15 defeat of Kilkenny in the final.

Career statistics

Honours

Rahoon-Salthill
Galway Under-21 B Hurling Championship (1): 2013

Galway
All-Ireland Senior Hurling Championship (1): 2017 
Leinster Senior Hurling Championship (2): 2017, 2018
National Hurling League Division 1 (1): 2017
All-Ireland Minor Hurling Championship (1): 2011

References

1993 births
Living people
Rahoon-Newcastle hurlers
Galway inter-county hurlers